Dafoe is a surname. It is probably a variant of Defoe, which is of uncertain origin, it may be a variation of Foe or Fow or an Anglicized form of a French name, possibly Thevoz, de Vaux or Devaux, Dufau or Dufou. Notable people with the surname include:

Allan Roy Dafoe (1883–1943), Canadian obstetrician
Byron Dafoe (born 1971), Canadian hockey player
Colin Scott Dafoe (1909–1969), Canadian surgeon
Donald Dafoe, American surgeon and research scientist
Frances Dafoe (1929–2016), Canadian figure skater 
John Wesley Dafoe (1866–1944), Canadian journalist
Willem Dafoe (born 1955), American film and stage actor

See also
Defoe (disambiguation)
Defoe (surname)
DeFeo

Notes